Troy Carter may refer to:

Troy Carter (politician) (born 1963), American politician
Troy Carter (talent manager) (born 1972), American music talent manager
Troy Carter (physicist) (born 1973), American plasma physicist

Fictional characters
2nd Lieutenant Troy Carter, character in Wing Commander (franchise), originated in 1990

See also
Carter (name)